The Cullman County Board of Education is composed of schools that serve Cullman County, Alabama, USA.

Member schools
Cold Springs Elementary School
Cold Springs High School 
Fairview Elementary School
Fairview Middle School
Fairview High School 
Garden City Elementary School (closed)
Good Hope Primary School 
Good Hope Elementary School
Good Hope Middle School 
Good Hope High School
Hanceville Elementary 
Hanceville Middle School 
Hanceville High School 
Harmony School 
Holly Pond Elementary School 
Holly Pond High School 
Parkside School
Vinemont Elementary School 
Vinemont Middle School 
Vinemont High School 
Welti Elementary 
West Point Elementary School 
West Point Intermediate 
West Point Middle School
West Point High School
C.A.R.E (Children At Risk Education Alternative School)
Cullman Area Technology Academy
Fast Track for Industry
Child Development Center

References

External links
Cullman County Board of Education

School districts in Alabama
Education in Cullman County, Alabama